Iceland competed at the 1964 Summer Olympics in Tokyo, Japan.  The Games were hosted from October 11, 1964, to October 24, 1964.

Athletics

Men
Field events

Combined events – Decathlon

Swimming 

Men

Women

References

External links
Official Olympic Reports

Nations at the 1964 Summer Olympics
1964
Summer Olympics